Robert Koch (1843–1910) was a German physician.

Robert Koch may also refer to:

Robert Koch (film), a 1939 German historical drama film
Robert Koch (footballer) (born 1986), German footballer
Robert Koch Woolf (1923–2004), American interior decorator
Bobby Koch (born 1960), American politician
Robot Koch, stage name for Robert Koch, a German, Los Angeles based electronic band

See also
Koch (disambiguation)

Koch, Robert